Hans Heinrich Egeberg (26 April 1877 – 1921) was a Danish heavyweight Greco-Roman wrestler. He won the Scandinavian championships in 1901, a European title in 1902, 1909 and 10, and a world title in 1907 and 1908. In 1908 he also placed second in the Danish boxing championships. After 1910 Egeberg wrestled professionally in a circus.

References

1877 births
1921 deaths
Danish male sport wrestlers
World Wrestling Championships medalists
20th-century Danish people